PSG Berani Zlín is an ice hockey team in the Czech 1. Liga. Their home arena is Zimní stadion Luďka Čajky in Zlín (The biggest city in the Moravian Wallachia). They won the Extraliga in 2004 and 2014. They were formerly known as Aukro Berani Zlín,  PSG Zlín, and HC Hamé Zlín, Now name is PSG Berani Zlín and Their home stadium Is Zimní Stadion Luďka Čajky (Zlín).

Honours

Domestic
Czech Extraliga
  Winners (2): 2003–04, 2013–14
  Runners-up (4): 1994–95, 1998–99, 2004–05, 2012–13
  3rd place (1): 2001–02

Czechoslovak Extraliga
  3rd place (3): 1984–85

Pre-season
Rona Cup
  Winners (3): 2005, 2011, 2015
  Runners-up (5): 1995, 2001, 2006, 2010, 2012

Tipsport Hockey Cup
  Runners-up (1): 2009

Players

Current roster

Club names
 1928 – SK Baťa Zlín
 1945 – ZK Baťa Zlín
 1948 – Sokol Botostroj Zlín
 1949 – Sokol Svit Gottwaldov
 1953-56 – DSO Jiskra a TJ Spartak ZPS
 1958/59 – TJ Gottwaldov
 1989/90 – TJ Zlín
 1990/91 – SK Zlín, AC ZPS Zlín
 1996/97 – HC ZPS-Barum Zlín
 1999/00 – HC Barum Continental
 2000/01 – HC Continental Zlín
 2002/03 – HC Hamé Zlín
 2007/08 – RI Okna Zlín
 2008/09 – PSG Zlín
 2017/18 – Aukro Berani Zlín
 2018 – PSG Berani Zlín

Players

 See :Category:HC Zlín players for a list of HC Zlín players past and present.

References

External links
 

Zlin
Sport in Zlín
1928 establishments in Czechoslovakia
Ice hockey clubs established in 1928